Big Thing is the debut album by Lisa Stansfield's band, Blue Zone. It was released by Arista Records in June 1988. The songs were written by Blue Zone members: Stansfield, Ian Devaney and Andy Morris, and produced by Paul Staveley O'Duffy. The album also includes one cover, "Jackie," co-produced by Ric Wake. Big Thing spawned three singles: "On Fire," "Thinking About His Baby" and "Jackie." A remastered and expanded deluxe 2-CD set was released in the United Kingdom on 18 November 2016; it was the album's first release in the band's native country.

Background
Blue Zone was formed in 1984 and consisted of Lisa Stansfield on vocals, and Ian Devaney and Andy Morris on instruments. In 1986, the trio released their first two singles: "Love Will Wait" and "Finest Thing." In 1987, they started working on their first album which was released in November 1988 but did not include "Love Will Wait" and "Finest Thing." The record company postponed the album many times and finally released it in Europe, North America and Australia in November 1988 and in Japan in early 1989. However, the album wasn't released in the United Kingdom until the 2016 deluxe edition.

Content
The album includes eleven songs (ten on the US edition) written by Lisa Stansfield, Ian Devaney and Andy Morris, except for "Jackie" written by Billy Steinberg and Tom Kelly. "Jackie" was originally recorded by Elisa Fiorillo in 1987 for the Summer School soundtrack. The album was produced by Paul Staveley O'Duffy, except for "Perfect Crime" produced by Blue Zone. Ric Wake co-produced "Jackie" and "Perfect Crime." The US edition contains the full intro of "Perfect Crime," which was cut on other versions of the album.

Singles
The first single from the album, "On Fire" was released on 26 October 1987 and peaked at number ninety-nine in the United Kingdom. The second single, "Thinking About His Baby" was issued on 25 January 1988 and reached number seventy-nine in the UK. On 26 July 1988, "Jackie" was released as a single in the United States and peaked at number fifty-four on the US Billboard Hot 100 and number thirty-seven on the Hot Dance Club Songs chart.

Track listing

Credits and personnel

Nat Augustin – backing vocals
Jocelyn Brown – backing vocals
Tim Cansfield – guitar
Ian Devaney – trombone, keyboards, guitar, backing vocals
Lance Ellington – backing vocals
Brandon Fields – saxophone
Big George – bass
Gary Grant – trumpet
Jerry Hey – trumpet
Dan Higgins – saxophone
Kim Hutchcroft – saxophone
Luís Jardim – percussion
Dee Lewis – backing vocals
Shirley Lewis – backing vocals
Charlie Loper – trombone
Dolette McDonald – backing vocals
Andy Morris – trumpet, flugelhorn, keyboards, backing vocals
Tessa Niles – backing vocals
Paul Staveley O'Duffy – producer
Phil Palmer – guitar
Tom Peterson – saxophone
Martyn Phillips – programming
Bill Reichenbach Jr. – trombone
Frank Ricotti – percussion
Kevin Whitehead – drums
Chris Whitten – drums
Marcus Williams – bass
Paul Wickens – keyboards

Release history

References

Lisa Stansfield albums
1988 debut albums
Arista Records albums